Miracle at St. Andrews is the third in the series of "Miracle at" golf novels by James Patterson and Peter de Jonge.

Plot
Travis McKinley spent four years as a professional golfer later in life and then he no longer was good enough to compete. He then took his family on a trip to England and then Scotland. While in Scotland he met a Scottish native he met at a golf course in the United States earlier. This man had helped him then improve his golf game and in Scotland his coaching helped Travis win a tournament. This was a dream come true for Travis and his family. But this is nothing compared to the chance Travis gets to play some of golfing's greats in a tournament at the place where golfing began, at St. Andrews.

Reviews
book reporter reviewed this book, although the review never told whether it liked the book or not.
The House Next Door did not immediately make The New York Times best sellers list. No other online reviews were located.

References

Novels by James Patterson
2019 American novels
Novels about golf
Little, Brown and Company books
Novels set in Scotland